The Chesapeake, Ohio and Southwestern Railroad was a 19th-century railway company in Kentucky in the United States. It operated from 1882, when it purchased the Paducah and Elizabethtown Railroad and the Memphis, Paducah and Northern Railroad, until 1896, when it was purchased by the Chicago, St. Louis and New Orleans Railroad. It later made up part of the Illinois Central network and its former rights-of-way currently form parts of the class-II Paducah and Louisville Railway.

It connected with the Owensboro and Nashville Railway (subsequently part of the L&N network) at Central City in Muhlenberg County.

See also
 List of Kentucky railroads

Defunct Kentucky railroads
Defunct companies based in Kentucky